The Banner is a playing card used in Swiss-suited cards and which historically formed part of the standard 36- or 48-card German-suited packs. It is equivalent to a 10, being ranked between a 9 and an Unter (or Under in Swiss German).

Name 
In German,  means “flag” or “banner” and is pronounced . It is grammatically neuter and its plural is the same: Banner. Historically it was also spelt Panier.

Characteristics 
In German-speaking Switzerland, to the east of the Brünig-Napf-Reuss line (the German-speaking part of Switzerland corresponding to the centre and east of the country), the most popular card deck is a pack of 36 cards with the Swiss suit symbols of Acorns, Bells, Roses and Shields and numbered as follows: 6, 7, 8, 9, 10 or Banner, Unter, Ober, King and Deuce.

While the pip cards 6 to 9 display a number of suit symbols corresponding to the number of the card, the 10 follows a different scheme. It has only one example of the suit symbol, much larger than on the other cards, depicted on a banner floating in the wind, which gives the card its name. Like the court cards, the Banners are double-ended in modern packs, the image begin repeated symmetrically about a diagonal line through the card, represented by the flagpole. Older patterns are sometimes single-ended.

History 
The Swiss Banner may be derived from old card games from the German-speaking regions of Europe which were based on a hunting theme, where cards worth ten points were also represented by a banner such as the Ambraser Hofjagdspiel and Stuttgarter Kartenspiel.

Gallery

See also 
 Playing card
 Jass
 Deuce
 Ober
 Unter

References 

Playing cards
Swiss culture